The Rotunda on Woolwich Common, in south-east London, was originally a very large wooden rotunda, designed by the Whig architect John Nash. Intended as a temporary structure, it was erected on the grounds of Carlton House, in 1814, for use as an additional reception room for the many events hosted there by the Prince Regent in celebration of the allied victory over Napoleon. The first event held in the wooden rotunda was a magnificent celebration in honour of the Duke of Wellington, in July 1814. The Regent ordered the removal of the rotunda from the grounds at Carlton House, in 1818. John Nash had hoped it would be converted into a church. However, the Regent directed that it be re-erected on Woolwich Common for use as a museum by the Royal Artillery.   When the building was re-erected in Woolwich, in 1820, its original architect, John Nash, turned it into a permanent structure with a lead roof and central supporting pillar.  In 1973 the Rotunda was designated as a Grade II* listed building.

It was used as the Royal Artillery Museum until 2001, when it was replaced by another. That museum then closed in 2016, and the collection moved to Wiltshire. The structure has no use and is on Historic England's Heritage at Risk list.

References

Bibliography

External links
 

Grade II* listed buildings in the Royal Borough of Greenwich
Infrastructure completed in 1814
1820 establishments in England
Defunct museums in London
Woolwich